Alex Hermans is a former Paralympian athlete from Belgium. He competed mainly in category F36 shot put events.

He competed in the 1980 Summer Paralympics in Arnhem, Netherlands.  There he won a gold medal in the men's Shot put - CP C event and a gold medal in the men's Long jump - CP C event.  He also competed at the 1984 Summer Paralympics in New York City, United States winning a gold medal in the men's Discus throw - C6 event, a gold medal in the men's Shot put - C6 event and went out in the quarter-finals of the men's 100 metres - C7 event.  He also competed at the 1988 Summer Paralympics in Seoul, South Korea winning a gold medal in the men's Shot put - C6 event.  He also competed in the 1992 Summer Paralympics in Barcelona, Spain.  There he won a gold medal in the men's Shot put - C6 event and finished seventh in the men's Discus throw - C7 event.  He also competed at the 1996 Summer Paralympics in Atlanta, United States., a silver medal in the men's Shot put - C6 event and finished fourth in the men's Discus throw - C7 event.  He also competed at the 2000 Summer Paralympics in Sydney, Australia winning a bronze medal in the men's Shot put - F36 event and finished fifth in the men's Discus throw - F36 event.

External links
 

Paralympic athletes of Belgium
Athletes (track and field) at the 1980 Summer Paralympics
Athletes (track and field) at the 1984 Summer Paralympics
Athletes (track and field) at the 1988 Summer Paralympics
Athletes (track and field) at the 1992 Summer Paralympics
Athletes (track and field) at the 1996 Summer Paralympics
Athletes (track and field) at the 2000 Summer Paralympics
Paralympic gold medalists for Belgium
Paralympic silver medalists for Belgium
Paralympic bronze medalists for Belgium
Living people
Medalists at the 1980 Summer Paralympics
Medalists at the 1984 Summer Paralympics
Medalists at the 1988 Summer Paralympics
Medalists at the 1992 Summer Paralympics
Medalists at the 1996 Summer Paralympics
Medalists at the 2000 Summer Paralympics
Year of birth missing (living people)
Paralympic medalists in athletics (track and field)
Belgian male shot putters
Belgian male long jumpers
Belgian male discus throwers